Una Biological Reserve is a Biological reserve in Brazil.

Location

It became part of the Central Atlantic Forest Ecological Corridor, created in 2002.
It is in the Una municipality of Bahia.

Removal of the original forest cover has caused accelerated erosion of the plateaus.
The reserve is in the basin of the Una River, which is fed by the Aliança and São Pedro rivers. 
The Serra River runs through the reserve from the west to the south east.
The Maruim River forms the natural border of the north west of the reserve.

The flora is a diverse example of Atlantic Forest biome.
Fauna include three species of seriously threatened endemic primates: the golden lion tamarin, black-tufted marmoset and golden-bellied capuchin.
The environment has been damaged by deforestation, removal of riparian vegetation and cattle damage to the river banks causing more extreme flooding and greater levels of sediment in the water.
This has had negative effects to the fauna.

Conservation

The Biological Reserve is a "strict nature reserve" under IUCN protected area category Ia.
The purpose is to fully preserve the biota and their natural attributes without direct human interference.

Protected birds in the reserve include the Atlantic black-breasted woodpecker (Celeus tinnunculus), black-headed berryeater (Carpornis melanocephala), red-billed curassow (Crax blumenbachii), banded cotinga (Cotinga maculata), Stresemann's bristlefront (Merulaxis stresemanni), band-tailed antwren (Myrmotherula urosticta), ochre-marked parakeet (Pyrrhura cruentata) and striated softtail (Thripophaga macroura).

Other protected species in the reserve include golden-headed lion tamarin (Leontopithecus chrysomelas), maned sloth (Bradypus torquatus), giant anteater (Myrmecophaga tridactyla), cougar (Puma concolor), Recife broad-nosed bat, Platyrrhinus recifinus, Hercules beetle (Dynastes hercules), the butterfly Napeogenes rhezia and the Characiformes fish Nematocharax venustus.

References

Sources

1980 establishments in Brazil
Biological reserves of Brazil
Protected areas of Bahia
Protected areas established in 1980
Protected areas of the Atlantic Forest